Sjöblom is a Swedish surname. Notable people with the surname include:

Axel Sjöblom (1882–1951), Swedish gymnast
Inga-Lill Sjöblom (born 1959), Swedish politician
Linnea Sjöblom (born 1989), Swedish racing cyclist
Marianne Sjöblom (1933–2014), Finnish fencer
Nils Sjöblom (1910–1993), Finnish fencer
Ruut Sjöblom (born 1976), Finnish politician
Titti Sjöblom (born 1949), Swedish singer
Ulla Sjöblom (1927–1989), Swedish film actress

Swedish-language surnames